Ōtūmoetai Intermediate is a co-ed Intermediate school situated in Tauranga, New Zealand.

Ōtūmoetai Intermediate offers many technology  classes, taken twice a week by the students. The tech classes are visual art, dance and drama, music, food, wood work, and ICT.

Notable alumni
 Luuka Jones (born 1988), Olympic slalom canoeist

Notes

External links
Ōtūmoetai Intermediate

Intermediate schools in New Zealand
Schools in Tauranga